The Navajo Sandstone is a geological formation in the Glen Canyon Group that is spread across the U.S. states of southern Nevada, northern Arizona, northwest Colorado, and Utah as part of the Colorado Plateau province of the United States.

Description 

The Navajo Sandstone is particularly prominent in southern Utah, where it forms the main attractions of a number of national parks and monuments including Red Rock Canyon National Conservation Area, Zion National Park, Capitol Reef National Park, Glen Canyon National Recreation Area, Grand Staircase–Escalante National Monument, and Canyonlands National Park.

Navajo Sandstone frequently overlies and interfingers with the Kayenta Formation of the Glen Canyon Group. Atop the cliffs, Navajo Sandstone often appears as massive rounded domes and bluffs that are generally white in color.

Appearance and provenance 

Navajo Sandstone frequently occurs as spectacular cliffs, cuestas, domes, and bluffs rising from the desert floor.  It can be distinguished from adjacent Jurassic sandstones by its white to light pink color, meter-scale cross-bedding, and distinctive rounded weathering.

The wide range of colors exhibited by the Navajo Sandstone reflect a long history of alteration by groundwater and other subsurface fluids over the last 190 million years. The different colors, except for white, are caused by the presence of varying mixtures and amounts of hematite, goethite, and limonite filling the pore space within the quartz sand comprising the Navajo Sandstone. The iron in these strata originally arrived via the erosion of iron-bearing silicate minerals.

Initially, this iron accumulated as iron-oxide coatings, which formed slowly after the sand had been deposited. Later, after having been deeply buried, reducing fluids composed of water and hydrocarbons flowed through the thick red sand which once comprised the Navajo Sandstone. The dissolution of the iron coatings by the reducing fluids bleached large volumes of the Navajo Sandstone a brilliant white. Reducing fluids transported the iron in solution until they mixed with oxidizing groundwater. Where the oxidizing and reducing fluids mixed, the iron precipitated within the Navajo Sandstone.

Depending on local variations within the permeability, porosity, fracturing, and other inherent rock properties of the sandstone, varying mixtures of hematite, goethite, and limonite precipitated within spaces between quartz grains. Variations in the type and proportions of precipitated iron oxides resulted in the different black, brown, crimson, vermillion, orange, salmon, peach, pink, gold, and yellow colors of the Navajo Sandstone.

The precipitation of iron oxides also formed laminae, corrugated layers, columns, and pipes of ironstone within the Navajo Sandstone. Being harder and more resistant to erosion than the surrounding sandstone, the ironstone weathered out as ledges, walls, fins, "flags", towers, and other minor features, which stick out and above the local landscape in unusual shapes.

Age and history of investigation 

The age of the Navajo Sandstone is somewhat controversial. It may originate from the Late Triassic but is at least as young as the Early Jurassic stages Pliensbachian and Toarcian. There is no type locality of the name. It was simply named for the 'Navajo Country' of the southwestern United States. The two major subunits of the Navajo are the Lamb Point Tongue (Kanab area) and the Shurtz Sandstone Tongue (Cedar City area).

The Navajo Sandstone was originally named as the uppermost formation of the La Plata Group by Gregory and Stone in 1917. Baker reassigned it as the upper formation of Glen Canyon Group in 1936. Its age was modified by Lewis and others in 1961. The name was originally not used in northwest Colorado and northeast Utah, where the name 'Glen Canyon Sandstone' was preferred. Its age was modified again by Padian in 1989.

A 2019 radioisotopic analysis suggests that the Navajo Sandstone formation is entirely Jurassic, extending for about 5.5 million years from the Hettangian age to the Sinemurian age.

Depositional environment 
The sandstone was deposited in an arid erg on the Western portion of the Supercontinent Pangaea. This region was affected by annual monsoons that came about each winter when cooler winds and wind reversal occurred.

Outcrop localities 

Navajo Sandstone outcrops are found in these geologic locations:
 Colorado Plateau
 Black Mesa Basin
 Great Basin province
 Paradox Basin
 Piceance Basin
 Plateau Sedimentary Province
 San Juan Basin
 Uinta Basin
 Uinta Uplift
 Uncompaghre Uplift

The formation is also found in these parklands (incomplete list):
 Glen Canyon National Recreation Area
 Grand Staircase–Escalante National Monument
 Zion National Park
 Canyonlands National Park
 Capitol Reef National Park
 Arches National Park
 Dinosaur National Monument
 Navajo National Monument
 Colorado National Monument
 Red Rock Canyon National Conservation Area
 Pink coral sand dunes, Kanab, Utah

Vertebrate paleofauna

Ornithodires 
Indeterminate theropod remains geographically located in Arizona, USA. Theropod tracks are geographically located in Arizona, Colorado, and Utah, USA. Ornithischian tracks located in Arizona, USA.

Iron oxide concretions 

The Navajo Sandstone is also well known among rockhounds for its hundreds of thousands of iron oxide concretions. Informally, they are called "Moqui marbles" and are believed to represent an extension of Hopi Native American traditions regarding ancestor worship ("moqui" translates to "the dead" in the Hopi language).   Thousands of these concretions weather out of outcrops of the Navajo Sandstone within south-central and southeastern Utah within an area extending from Zion National Park eastward to Arches and Canyonland national parks. They are quite abundant within Grand Staircase–Escalante National Monument.

The iron oxide concretions found in the Navajo Sandstone exhibit a wide variety of sizes and shapes. Their shape ranges from spheres to discs; buttons; spiked balls; cylindrical hollow pipe-like forms; and other odd shapes. Although many of these concretions are fused together like soap bubbles, many more also occur as isolated concretions, which range in diameter from the size of peas to baseballs. The surface of these spherical concretions can range from being very rough to quite smooth. Some of the concretions are grooved spheres with ridges around their circumference.

The abundant concretions found in the Navajo Sandstone consist of sandstone cemented together by hematite (Fe2O3), and goethite (FeOOH). The iron forming these concretions came from the breakdown of iron-bearing silicate minerals by weathering to form iron oxide coatings on other grains. During later diagenesis of the Navajo Sandstone while deeply buried, reducing fluids, likely hydrocarbons, dissolved these coatings. When the reducing fluids containing dissolved iron mixed with oxidizing groundwater, they and the dissolved iron were oxidized. This caused the iron to precipitate out as hematite and goethite to form the innumerable concretions found in the Navajo Sandstone. Evidence suggests that microbial metabolism may have contributed to the formation of some of these concretions. These concretions are regarded as terrestrial analogues of the hematite spherules, called alternately Martian "blueberries" or more technically Martian spherules, which the Opportunity rover found at Meridiani Planum on Mars.

See also 

 List of fossiliferous stratigraphic units in Utah
 Toarcian turnover
 Toarcian formations
Marne di Monte Serrone, Italy
 Calcare di Sogno, Italy
 Sachrang Formation, Austria
 Posidonia Shale, Lagerstätte in Germany
 Ciechocinek Formation, Germany and Poland
 Krempachy Marl Formation, Poland and Slovakia
 Lava Formation, Lithuania
 Azilal Group, North Africa
 Whitby Mudstone, England
 Fernie Formation, Alberta and British Columbia
 Poker Chip Shale
 Whiteaves Formation, British Columbia
 Los Molles Formation, Argentina
 Mawson Formation, Antarctica
 Kandreho Formation, Madagascar
 Kota Formation, India
 Cattamarra Coal Measures, Australia

References

Further reading

General 
 Anonymous (2011a) Navajo Sandstone (in Glen Canyon Group) Capitol Reef National Park: Geological Overview. STAR: Sedimentary & Terrestrial Analog Research group, Department of Geology & Geophysics, University of Utah, Salt Lake City, Utah. last accessed August 18, 2013
 Anonymous (2011b) Navajo Sandstone, Stratigraphy of the Parks of the Colorado Plateau. U.S. Geological Survey, Reston, Virginia. last accessed August 18, 2013
 
 Elder, J. (2005) Hele-Shaw Cell: Avalanche Segregation and Stratification. Utah Sand, Ottawa, Canada. last accessed August 18, 2013
 Loope, D.B. (nda) Photos - Navajo Sandstone trace fossils. Dr. David B. Loope – Sedimentology and Stratigraphy, Department of Earth and Atmospheric Sciences, University of Wyoming, Laramie, Wyoming. last accessed August 18, 2013
 Loope, D.B. (ndb) Photos - Navajo Sandstone- Rain-Induced Slumps. Dr. David B. Loope – Sedimentology and Stratigraphy, Department of Earth and Atmospheric Sciences, University of Wyoming, Laramie, Wyoming. last accessed August 18, 2013
 Loope, D.B. (ndc) Dry-Season Dinosaur Tracks in the Navajo Sandstone. PDF Version (3.9 MB) poster. Dr. David B. Loope – Sedimentology and Stratigraphy, Department of Earth and Atmospheric Sciences, University of Wyoming, Laramie, Wyoming. last accessed August 18, 2013
 Ostapuk, P., (nd) Navajo Sandstone Fossils.  Glen Canyon Natural History Association, Page, Arizona. last accessed August 18, 2013
 Peters, P.E., and N.A. Heim (nd) Navajo Sandstone Formation - Glen Canyon Group: Spatial Distribution in Macrostrat. Macrostrat Beta 0.3, Department of Geoscience, University of Wisconsin-Madison, Madison, Wisconsin. last accessed August 18, 2013
 Pratt, S.. (2003) Tracing the Navajo sandstone. Geotimes. (November 2003). last accessed August 18, 2013
 Stamm, N. (2013) Geologic Unit: Navajo Sandstone., National Geologic Database. U.S. Geological Survey, Reston, Virginia. last accessed August 18, 2013
 Vendetti, J. (2001) Jurassic monsoons. Geotimes. (September 2001). last accessed August 18, 2013

Scientific publications 
 Chan, M.A., and A.W. Archer (2000) Cyclic Eolian Stratification on the Jurassic Navajo Sandstone, Zion National Park: Periodicities and Implications for Paleoclimate PDF version, 3.2 MB. in D.A. Sprinkel, T.C. Chidsey, Jr., and P.B. Anderson, eds., Geology of Utah's Parks and Monuments. Utah Geological Association Publication 28:1-11. last accessed August 18, 2013
 Kocurek G. 2003. Limits on extreme Eolian systems: Sahara of Mauritania and Jurassic Navajo Sandstone examples. in M. Chan and A. Archer, eds., Extreme Depositional Environments: Mega End Members in Geologic Time. Geological Society of America Special Paper 370:43-52. last accessed August 18, 2013
 Loope, D.B., and C.M. Rowe (2003) Long-Lived Pluvial Episodes during Deposition of the Navajo Sandstone PDF version, 1.3 MB. The Journal of Geology 111:223-232. last accessed August 18, 2013
 Loope, D.B., and C.M. Rowe (2005) Seasonal Patterns of wind and rain recorded by the Navajo Sandstone PDF version, 7.4 MB. Canyon Legacy. 54:8-12. last accessed August 18, 2013
 Loope, D.B., and Z.C. Zanner (2005) Eolian Pin Stripes in the Navajo Sandstone. Geological Society of America Abstracts with Programs, Vol. 37, No. 7, p. 506. last accessed August 18, 2013
 Loope, D., L. Eisenberg, and E. Waiss (2004) Navajo sand sea of near-equatorial Pangea: Tropical westerlies, slumps, and giant stromatolites. in E.P. Nelson and E.A. Erslev, eds., pp. 1–13, Field Trips in the Southern Rocky Mountains, USA. GSA Field Guide no. 5, Geological Society of America, Boulder, Colorado. last accessed August 18, 2013
 Loope, D.B., C.M. Rowe, and R.M. Joeckel (2001) Annual monsoon rains recorded by Jurassic dunes PDF version, 284 KB. Nature. 412:64-66. last accessed August 18, 2013
 Loope, D.B., M.B. Steiner, C.M. Rowe, and N. Lancaster (2004) Tropical westerlies over Pangean sand seas PDF version, 340 KB. Sedimentology. 51:315-322. last accessed August 18, 2013
 Irmis, R.B. (2005) A review of the vertebrate fauna of the Lower Jurassic Navajo Sandstone in Arizona. PDF version, 2.4 MB in R.D. McCord, ed., pp. 55–71, Vertebrate Paleontology of Arizona. Mesa Southwest Museum Bulletin no. 11. Mesa Southwest Museum, Arizona Museum of Natural History, Mesa, Arizona. last accessed August 18, 2013
 Rainforth, E.C. (1997) Vertebrate ichnological diversity and census studies, Lower Jurassic Navajo Sandstone PDF version, 3.9 MB. Unpublished masters thesis, Department of Geological Sciences, University of Colorado, Boulder. last accessed August 18, 2013
 Tape, C. (2005) The Lower Jurassic Navajo Sandstone: large-scale deposition and small-scale structures, Site: Glen Canyon Dam. PDF version, 4.8 MB. in J.L. Kirschvink, ed., Field Trip to Colorado Plateau (southern Utah, northern Arizona, Permian-Triassic boundary). Division of Geological and Planetary Sciences, California Institute of Technology, University of California. last accessed August 18, 2013

Geologic formations of Arizona
Geologic formations of Colorado
Geologic formations of Nevada
Geologic formations of Utah
Jurassic System of North America
Jurassic Arizona
Jurassic Colorado
Jurassic geology of Nevada
Jurassic geology of Utah
Hettangian Stage
Sinemurian Stage
Dolomite formations
Limestone formations of the United States
Sandstone formations of the United States
Geologic formations with imbedded sand dunes
Ergs
Aeolian deposits
Ichnofossiliferous formations
Fossiliferous stratigraphic units of North America
Paleontology in Arizona
Paleontology in Colorado
Paleontology in Nevada
Paleontology in Utah